The men's doubles soft tennis event was part of the soft tennis programme and took place between 14 and 15 December 1998, at the Thammasat Tennis Field.

Schedule
All times are Indochina Time (UTC+07:00)

Results

Round robin

Pool A

Pool B

Pool C

Pool D

Pool E

Pool F

Pool G

Pool H

Final round

References 

Results
Results

External links 
soft-tennis.org

Soft tennis at the 1998 Asian Games